Greek economy referendum may refer to:
2011 Greek proposed economy referendum
2015 Greek bailout referendum